Nimrod David Pfeffer (born November 14, 1984) is an Israeli conductor and pianist.

Pfeffer is a conductor at the Metropolitan Opera in New York, and is Music Director of the Lyric Opera Company of Guatemala.

His recent conducting engagements include the Mariinsky Theatre Orchestra, the San Francisco Symphony Orchestra, the Hungarian State Opera Orchestra, the Palau de les Arts Reina Sofía in Valencia, the Juilliard Opera, and the Israeli Opera.

In season 2021/22 he made his conducting debuts at the Metropolitan Opera with Le Nozze di Figaro, the Komische Oper Berlin with Die Zauberflöte, and the Stuttgart Philharmonic Orchestra. He also conducted the season opening production of the New Israeli Opera with Barrie Kosky's production of Die Zauberflöte.

In season 2022/23 Mr. Pfeffer will return to the New Israeli Opera to conduct Theodor - a new opera in Hebrew by Yonatan Cnaan and Ido Ricklin focusing on two periods in the early life of the prophet of the State of Israel, Theodor Herzl, and will also make his conducting debut with the Hungarian National Philharmonic Orchestra in a program of works by Schubert, Liszt and Lajtha.

In 2016 Pfeffer was named Music Director of the Lyric Opera Company of Guatemala, after conducting the company's inaugural production of Rigoletto. In the following seasons he conducted there new productions of L'elisir d'amore, La Bohème, and La Traviata

Pfeffer is also a concert pianist who performs regularly as soloist with orchestras, recitalist, chamber musician, and vocal accompanist. He made his recital debut at Carnegie Hall’s Weill recital Hall in 2008. In 2007 he performed a solo recital from the Russian Kremlin that was broadcast in Russian television, and in 2010 he performed music by Chopin on the stage of The Metropolitan Opera in American Ballet Theatre's production of The Lady of the Camellias. He made his solo debut with the Israel Philharmonic Orchestra in 2008, playing the World Premiere of Aharon Harlap's Second Piano Concerto. The composer dedicated his Symphonic Dances for Piano and Orchestra to Pfeffer in 2015.

Pfeffer is dedicated to promoting dialogue between Arabs and Jews in his native Israel. In 2009 he presented a concert in honor of peace at Carnegie Hall's Weill Recital Hall with Arab-Israeli pianist Bishara Haroni, benefiting the Jezreel Valley Music Center, a music school where Arabs and Jews study music together, which was in financial difficulties. The performance helped to raise funds and bring media attention to the school. Mr. Pfeffer received the Davis Projects for Peace Award for this initiative.

Pfeffer completed his Master's degree in Orchestral Conducting as a student of Alan Gilbert at The Juilliard School, as a recipient of the Bruno Walter Scholarship. Upon graduation from Juilliard he was awarded the Charles Schiff Conducting Prize and the Norman Benzaquen Career Advancement Grant. He holds a Master's degree and Professional Studies Diplomas in Piano Performance and in Orchestral Conducting from Mannes College of Music, and is a graduate of The Metropolitan Opera's Lindemann Young Artist Development Program. Among his teachers were Gideon Hatzor, Vadim Monastyrski, Pnina Salzman, Victor Rosenbaum, Carl Schachter, Michael Wolpe, André Hajdu, Claude Frank, Byron Janis, Alan Gilbert, James Levine, and Richard Goode.

External links
Nimrod David Pfeffer's official website

References

1984 births
21st-century conductors (music)
Music directors
Music directors (opera)
Israeli conductors (music)
Ballet conductors
Jewish classical musicians
Tel Aviv University alumni
Musicians from New York City
People from Tel Aviv
Living people